Vu Hoang Tran (born 1975; Vietnamese name: Trần Hoàng Vũ) is a Vietnamese American writer. His debut novel, Dragonfish, was released in 2015.

Life
Vu Tran was born in Saigon in 1975, and grew up in Tulsa, Oklahoma. He graduated from the University of Tulsa with an MA, from the Iowa Writers' Workshop with an MFA, and from the University of Nevada, Las Vegas as a Glenn Schaeffer Fellow in Fiction with a PhD.

His work has appeared in the Southern Review, Glimmer Train Stories, Harvard Review, Fence Magazine, Michigan Quarterly Review, Nimrod, Interim, and Antioch Review.

He currently teaches creative writing at the University of Chicago.

Awards
 2011 Finalist Award – Vilcek Prize for Creative Promise in Literature
 2009 Whiting Award
 2004 Lawrence Foundation Prize from the Michigan Quarterly Review
 2003 Short-Story Award for New Writers from Glimmer Train Stories

Works

Books
 Dragonfish (W. W. Norton, 2015)

Anthologies

References

21st-century American novelists
21st-century Vietnamese writers
American writers of Vietnamese descent
People from Ho Chi Minh City
Iowa Writers' Workshop alumni
University of Tulsa alumni
University of Nevada, Las Vegas alumni
University of Nevada, Las Vegas faculty
Vietnamese emigrants to the United States
1975 births
Living people
21st-century American short story writers